Anna Jewsbury is a British fashion designer and artistic director of London-based jewellery brand, Completedworks

Personal life 

Jewsbury grew up in the Pennines, UK and now lives and works in London. She is married to author and development expert Hassan Damluji with whom she has a son.

Education 
Jewsbury attended the same school as sculptor Barbara Hepworth, cited as an influence on her work. She went on to study Mathematics and Philosophy at the University of Oxford.

Work 
Jewsbury founded her brand Completedworks in 2013

References 

Living people
English fashion designers
British women fashion designers
British jewellery designers
Alumni of the University of Oxford
Year of birth missing (living people)
Women jewellers